Charles McMullen is an Irish Presbyterian minister, elected in February 2018 as the moderator-elect of the Presbyterian Church in Ireland. He took office in June 2018, succeeding Noble McNeely. 
 At the Assembly two controversial decisions were made. First, the Presbyterian Church in Ireland loosened its links to the Church of Scotland. Secondly, the Church received a report from its Doctrine Committee concerning the nature of a credible profession of faith with reference to those in same sex relationships.

McMullen is a regular contributor to BBC Radio Ulster's Thought for the Day.

References 

Year of birth missing (living people)
Living people
Presbyterian ministers from Northern Ireland
Moderators of the Presbyterian Church in Ireland